Lee Chu-hong (born June 24, 1983) is a South Korean former competitive figure skater. She is the 2000 South Korean national silver medalist and 1999 & 2001 national bronze medalist. She competed in the free skate at two ISU Championships, finishing 18th at the 2000 Four Continents and 23rd at the 2001 World Junior Championships.

Programs

Results

References

External links
 

South Korean female single skaters
1983 births
Living people
Sportspeople from Daegu
Competitors at the 2003 Winter Universiade
Competitors at the 2005 Winter Universiade